The 1957 Copa del Generalísimo was the 55th staging of the Spanish Cup. The competition began on 28 April 1957 and concluded on 16 June 1957 with the final.

Round of 16

|}
Tiebreaker

|}

Quarter-finals

|}

Semi-finals

|}

Final

|}

External links
 rsssf.com
 linguasport.com

1957
Copa del Rey
Copa